Hypolimnas dinarcha, the large variable diadem or large variable eggfly, is a butterfly in the family Nymphalidae. It is found in Sierra Leone, Liberia, Ivory Coast, Ghana, Nigeria, Cameroon, Gabon, the Republic of the Congo, Angola, the Democratic Republic of the Congo, the Central African Republic, Uganda, Kenya and Tanzania. The habitat consists of heavy lowland forests and secondary forests with a closed canopy.

Adult males mud-puddle and are also occasionally attracted to fermented fruit and animal droppings.  There are two colour morphs. The light morph may be a mimic of a day-flying moth, while the dark morph appears to be a mimic of Amauris vashti.

The larvae feed on Fleurya species.

Subspecies
Hypolimnas chapmani dinarcha (Sierra Leone, Liberia, Ivory Coast, Ghana, Nigeria, Cameroon, Gabon, Congo, Angola: Cabinda, Democratic Republic of the Congo, Central African Republic)
Hypolimnas chapmani grandis Rothschild, 1918 (Uganda, western Kenya, north-western Tanzania)

References

Butterflies described in 1865
dinarcha
Butterflies of Africa
Taxa named by William Chapman Hewitson